Jerry is a 2006 Indian Tamil romantic comedy film directed by S. B. Khanthan, produced by V. Vishwanathan, and written by Crazy Mohan. The film stars Jithan Ramesh as the titular character, while Shruthi Raj, Mumtaj, and Meera Vasudevan play the female leads. The music was composed by Ramesh Vinayagam with editing done by Krishnakumar. The film released on 19 May 2006.

Plot
Jayaram alias Jerry (Jithan Ramesh) is a man who takes risks and hates love. He is challenged by his friends to make three women love him. He makes his classmate Janaki (Shruthi Raj), an actress Janani (Mumtaj), and a police officer Jeeva (Meera Vasudevan) fall in love with him. Whether the three girls find out and whom he unites with forms the crux of the story.

Cast

Jithan Ramesh as Jayaram alias Jerry
Shruthi Raj as Janaki
Mumtaj as Janani
Meera Vasudevan as Jeeva
Santhana Bharathi as Jerry's father
Madhan Bob as Janaki's father
Raaghav as Gausik
Crazy Mohan as Rukku
Maadhu Balaji as Master Maadhu
Cheenu Mohan as Film Director
Sachu as College Principal
Neelu as Jerry's grandfather
Chaams as Dhandapani
Sathish as Farooque

Production
The film's script was written by Crazy Mohan and he described the film as his "pet project" as he wanted to do create similar to Kadhalikka Neramillai (1964). The film was earlier titled Idhuthan Kadhal Enbathaa.

Soundtrack
The soundtrack was composed by Ramesh Vinayagam.
"Hollywood" - Sharreth, Subiksha
"Kanava" - Sujatha
"En Swasathil" - Madhu Balakrishnan, Kalyani Nair
"Kapildevda" - David Bhaskar
"Naan Pudicha" - Ramesh Vinayagam, Vidya

Critical reception
Indiaglitz wrote "Director S B Kanthan deserves a pat for getting the best from his artistes. Though the movie seems to be an extension of Crazy Mohan's stage plays, the hilarious sequence makes it engrossing". Balaji B. wrote "Jery is simply a big-screen version of one of 'Crazy' Mohan's stage dramas. It is clean and harmless but unfortunately it is also mostly laughless".

References

External links
 

2006 films
Indian romantic comedy films
2000s Tamil-language films
Indian films based on plays
Films scored by Ramesh Vinayakam
Films with screenplays by Crazy Mohan
2006 directorial debut films
2006 romantic comedy films